The Great Eastern Railway (GER) Class G14 was a class of 2-4-0 steam locomotives.

The Class G14 was designed by Thomas William Worsdell for the express service from London to Norwich, the first locomotive produced while he was superintendent. A total of 20 were built, 562–564 in late 1882 and the rest in 1883.

Details 
The locomotive was designed for the Great Eastern Railway's London to Norwich route on which the frequent sharp curves between London and Cambridge necessitated that the wheelbase not be entirely rigid, so a radial axle box was fitted to the front wheels giving 1 1/2 inches of side motion each way controlled by a horizontal elliptical spring. It used Joy valve gear, with the valves placed on top of the cylinders, allowing them to be brought closer together allowing larger cylinders and longer bearings, the Joy valve motion having the benefit of not requiring space on the crankshaft for eccentrics.

The locomotives were numbered 562 to 571, and 640 to 649, 20 in total.

Accidents/Incidents 
In Swaffham on 31 January 1894 G14 number 567 managed to either run across the turntable, or reverse out of it instead of moving forward, and crashed through the buffer stops and down a steep bank tender first. The locomotive fortunately being saved by the tender which jammed between the rear of the locomotive and the road below that separated the engine yard from Northwell Pool.

References 

2-4-0 locomotives
G14
Railway locomotives introduced in 1882
Standard gauge steam locomotives of Great Britain